Saint Anne/Immaculate Conception Parish is a former Roman Catholic parish in Hartford, CT. It was closed in 2017 as part of a major restructuring within the Archdiocese of Hartford. The parish was established in 2000, from the consolidation of the former Saint Anne Parish and Immaculate Conception Parish, both of which were located in the Frog Hollow neighborhood. The consolidated parish occupied the former Saint Anne Church building; the Immaculate Conception building is now operated as a homeless shelter. In 2017, the parish was further consolidated into St. Augustine Parish (Hartford, Connecticut), and the Saint Anne church building subsequently closed.

References

Roman Catholic churches in Hartford, Connecticut